Tyrosine-protein phosphatase non-receptor type 18 is an enzyme that in humans is encoded by the PTPN18 gene.

The protein encoded by this gene is a member of the protein tyrosine phosphatase (PTP) family. PTPs are known to be signaling molecules that regulate a variety of cellular processes including cell growth, differentiation, mitotic cycle, and oncogenic transformation. This PTP contains a PEST motif, which often serves as a protein-protein interaction domain, and may be related to protein intracellular half-life. This gene was found to be expressed in brain, colon tissues, and several different tumor-derived cell lines. The biological function of this PTP has not yet been determined.

Interactions
PTPN18 has been shown to interact with PSTPIP1.

References

Further reading